Tuuli Roosma (born 26 May 1975, Tallinn) is an Estonian television journalist and producer.

Since 1995 she has worked on television as a host, editor and producer. In 2007 she founded the production company Reede.

Selected filmography
 2008 Fritsud ja blondiinid (documental film; executive producer)
 2008 Saladused (television series; producer)
 2008 Teie pilet, palun! (documental film; producer)
 2010 Ühikarotid (television series; producer)
 2012 Suletud uste taga (television series; producer)
 2012 Ühikarotid: Õed (television series; producer)
 2015 Kristus elab Siberis (documental film; co-producer)
 2017 Litsid (television series; producer)

References

Living people
1975 births
Estonian journalists
Estonian women journalists
Estonian television producers
Estonian women television producers
Tallinn University of Technology alumni
People from Tallinn